Guitarist is a British monthly music making magazine published by Future plc. It is the longest-established European guitar magazine, and is currently the biggest-selling guitar magazine in the UK. The magazine's current editor is Jamie Dickson, who has been in charge since late 2013. Each issue covers three areas: reviews, interview and technique. This may include reviews of newly released guitars, amplifiers and other equipment; interviews with famous and up-and-coming guitar players; and features on the guitar industry, news articles, playing technique with tablature. Guitarists slogan was previously "The Guitar Player's Bible", before changing in 2012 to "The Guitar Magazine". In the June 2014 edition, Guitarist celebrated its 30th Anniversary.

Gear reviews 
One of the key features of Guitarist is its large and in-depth gear reviews section, which is produced by some of the most respected and experienced guitar writers in the world, including Dave Burrluck, Neville Marten and Mick Taylor. The gear aspect of the magazine covers reviews of all the latest guitar equipment from major and boutique makers from around the world. As well as electric guitars and acoustic guitars, the magazine also reviews guitar amplifiers, effects pedals, electric basses and various pro-audio and recording equipment applicable to guitar players.

Gear reviews within the magazine comprise two distinct elements. First Play reviews are located near the front of the magazine and generally focus on high-end products. These reviews place an emphasis on the high-quality, artistic photography the mag prides itself for, but often will not go into the same level of forensic detail as reviews elsewhere in Guitarist.

The second type of review featured in the magazine are the Feature Reviews, located in the back half of each issue. These reviews are designed to go in-depth on new and interesting gear, and also go behind the scenes, talking to the people involved in the creation of the instruments, or explore the history of that instrument in a more feature-like way.

Where applicable, all the gear reviewed in Guitarist is accompanied by a video demo of that product, produced by the magazine's in-house team - often the product will be demoed by the reviewer himself. These demos can be either a straight up demonstration of the product's features, a short piece of original music created using the product in question, or occasionally, a talking-head discussion of the guitar on show between members of the Guitarist team, with playing examples interspersed throughout. These video demos were previously accessed via the Guitarist CD/DVD, or the online Guitarist Vault download archive. From 2014, however, the video demos have been available as a private YouTube playlist, accessed via a direct link printed in each issue.

In addition to gear reviews, each issue also features an in-depth Q&A section, where reader's technical queries and problems are answered by Guitarist's experts, as well as a long-term test section, where members of the Guitarist team take recently reviewed products on a six-month trial to see how they feature in the real world.

Features and artists  
Guitarist has primarily always focussed on blues, folk and classic rock and metal when it comes to interviews and features. While that remains its core, in recent years the title has broadened its scope to include artists from a wide array of guitar-focussed genres, including alternative rock, modern metal, progressive rock, jazz, country, shred guitar and many others.

Artist interviews in Guitarist are focussed on famous or noteworthy guitar players, and interviews are conducted from a more 'guitar' point of view than a regular music magazine interview - discussions of the artist in question's playing style, gear choices and general attitude to the guitar are commonplace. Occasionally, Guitarist will get the artist in question to either demonstrate their gear or playing on video, which is then available to view on the Guitarist YouTube channel. Recent artists who have been featured in Guitarist include: Joe Perry, Jimmy Page, Marc Ford, Joe Bonamassa, Charlie Hunter, Jackson Browne, Guthrie Govan, Jim Campilongo, Eric Johnson and Steve Vai.

In addition to artist interviews, Guitarist regularly features in-depth features relating to a specific guitarist, guitar or musical genre. Recent examples of these in-depth features include cover features a forensic examination and history of Brian May's guitar The Red Special, a similar treatment of David Gilmour's famous Black Stratocaster, historical features on blues legends, slide guitar, the Fender Stratocaster, the Gibson Les Paul and various others.

Playing and technique  
Guitarist has previously included a large technique section at the rear of the magazine with columns reflecting a wide array of different guitar styles, however, this has in recent years been reduced to a single regular column, the long-running Blues Headlines with longtime Guitar Techniques and Guitarist contributor Richard Barrett.

While the magazine features fewer monthly technique columns, instead Guitarist now regularly peppers its features section with 'style files'. These style files are often amended to an artist interview or history feature, and are designed to allow the reader to learn the playing style of the artist or genre featured therein. An example of this is the 'Aces' feature, which covers a different legendary guitar player from the early days of the electric guitar. The feature comprises a history of the artist's life and contribution to guitar music, which is then followed by a style file encapsulating his key innovations and stylistic techniques.

All tuition content in the magazine is accompanied by tablature of each lesson or example, as well as video and audio content, including backing tracks, to make learning easier.

Video and audio content 
Every month Guitarist produces pro-level video demos of all of the products reviewed in the magazine that month, as well as video interviews and features with top guitar artists, and audio examples for the Blues Headlines tuition column, and video and audio examples to accompany any other tuition featured in the magazine that month (these regularly include 'play in the style of' columns, as well as video masterclasses with famous guitar players such as Joe Bonamassa).

These videos are available to watch online via a private YouTube playlist link featured in the magazine each month, or if you purchase the iPad version of the magazine, all video and audio content is embedded to watch offline.

Digital versions 
Since late-2011, Guitarist has been available to purchase in digital forms - initially just on Apple iPad, but later on Android devices, iPhones and the Kindle Fire.

Initially, a bespoke Guitarist Deluxe edition of the magazine was produced for the iPad. Launching to coincide with the introduction of Apple Newsstand, it was a fully enhanced digital edition of the magazine, with fully interactive audio and video content, pages specifically designed to be read on the iPad, and various other multimedia features. This was discontinued in late 2012, and the magazine moved to its current page-turner format.

On Android, Kindle and Zinio devices, the digital edition of Guitarist is a simple digital facsimile of the print product, however, the iOS Newsstand version is enhanced with embedded video and audio content, as well as image galleries.

Other products  
In addition to the regular magazine, Guitarist produces a number of one-off and semi-regular editions. These have included 100 Great Guitar Players, 100 Great Guitars, The Guitarist Guide To Effects and The Guitarist Guide To Home Recording.

In late 2013, Guitarist launched a quarterly sister-title, named Guitarist Presents Acoustic. As the name suggest, this title provides the same mix of gear reviews, interviews and playing tuition as the primary title, but is focussed purely on acoustic guitars and guitar players.

Current editorial team 
Editor-in-Chief: Jamie Dickson
Deputy Editor: David Mead
Reviews Editor: Dave Burrluck
Managing Editor: Lucy Rice
Art Editor: Darren Phillips
Senior Music Editor: Jason Sidwell

Sister titles
Guitarist was purchased by Future Publishing from Music Maker Publications in 1997, and became part of the company's Music Making portfolio, which included guitar titles Total Guitar and Guitar Techniques, as well as Rhythm, Future Music, Computer Music and others. From 2008 onward, Future made Guitarist part of their MusicRadar website, along with all of the company's other music making website. In January 2020, GuitarWorld.com became the new online home for Guitarist, along with sister titles Total Guitar, Guitar Techniques and Bass Player.

References

External links
 

1984 establishments in the United Kingdom
Monthly magazines published in the United Kingdom
Music magazines published in the United Kingdom
Guitar magazines
Magazines established in 1984
Mass media in Cambridge